Noriyuki Shiroishi (城石 憲之, born April 17, 1973 in Ōmiya, Saitama, Japan) is a former Nippon Professional Baseball infielder.

External links

1973 births
Living people
Baseball people from Saitama Prefecture
Japanese baseball players
Nippon Professional Baseball infielders
Nippon Ham Fighters players
Yakult Swallows players
Tokyo Yakult Swallows players
Japanese baseball coaches
Nippon Professional Baseball coaches